"Real Good Feel Good Song" is a song written by Richard Fagan and Larry Alderman, and recorded by American country music artist Mel McDaniel. It was released in April 1988 as the third single from McDaniel's album, Now You're Talkin.  It peaked at number 9 on the U.S. Billboard Hot Country Singles & Tracks chart and number 4 on the Canadian RPM Country Tracks chart.

Music video
The music video was directed by Kenneth Brown and premiered in mid-1988.

Charts

Weekly charts

Year-end charts

References

Songs about music
1988 singles
Mel McDaniel songs
Songs written by Richard Fagan
Song recordings produced by Jerry Kennedy
Capitol Records Nashville singles
1987 songs